Lee Seung-il is a South Korean actor and model. He is known for his roles in dramas When I Was the Most Beautiful, Can Love Be Refunded, At Eighteen, My Absolute Boyfriend and he appeared in movies such as Lucky Monster, The Flatterer and The Labyrinth.

Biography and career 
He was born on June 7, 1994 in South Korea. In Middle School Lee Seung-il was interested in swimming at age four in third year but he dislocated his shoulder during a match and he quit swimming. Lee parents encouraged him for acting. He attended High School Humanities. After he completed his studies and he joined Different Company as a model and actor. He did modeling for various commercials of Samsung Electronics Samsung TV The Sero and Dungeon & Fighter Coming out! Arad Ranger.

In 2019 he made his acting debut in web series Love Can Be Refunded playing Hyun-su and he also appeared in dramas At Eighteen and My Absolute Boyfriend. He also did modeling for Italian men's brand Benaco & Fontana.

The following year in 2020 he appeared in dramas Twenty-Twenty, as Kwon Ki-jung When I Was the Most Beautiful as Song In-ho and he also appeared in movies Lucky Monster and The Flatterer.

In 2021 he appeared in drama Peng as Jeon Woo-sang and he also appeared in horror movie The Labyrinth'' as No Dae-young.

Personal life 
Lee Seung-il already did his military service before making his debut as an actor and model and he served in the military since 2018 at Republic of Korea Army Mark Army Marine Corps.

Filmography

Television series

Web series

Film

Commercial Ads

References

External links 
 
 

1994 births
Living people
21st-century South Korean male actors
South Korean male models
South Korean male television actors
South Korean male film actors